The Binding of Isaac, or simply "The Binding", is a story from Genesis 22 of the Hebrew Bible. In the biblical narrative, God tells Abraham to sacrifice his son, Isaac, on Moriah. As Abraham begins to comply, having bound Isaac to an altar, he is stopped by the Angel of the Lord; a ram appears and is slaughtered in Isaac's stead, as God commends Abraham's pious obedience.

In addition to being addressed by modern scholarship, this biblical episode has been the focus of a great deal of commentary in traditional sources of Judaism, Christianity, and Islam.

Biblical narrative

According to the Hebrew Bible, God commands Abraham to offer his son Isaac as a sacrifice. After Isaac is bound to an altar, a messenger from God stops Abraham before the sacrifice finishes, saying "now I know you fear God". Abraham looks up and sees a ram and sacrifices it instead of Isaac.

The passage states that the event occurred at "the mount of the " in "the land of Moriah". 2 Chronicles 3:1 refers to "mount Moriah" as the site of Solomon's Temple, while Psalms 24:3, Isaiah 2:3 and 30:29, and Zechariah 8:3 use the term "the mount of the " to refer to the site of Solomon's Temple in Jerusalem, the location believed to be the Temple Mount in Jerusalem. In the Samaritan Pentateuch, Genesis 22:14, the phrase  is taken to mean "in the mountain the Lord was seen", the mountain being Mount Gerizim.

Jewish views

In The Binding of Isaac, Religious Murders & Kabbalah, Lippman Bodoff argues that Abraham never intended to actually sacrifice his son, and that he had faith that God had no intention that he do so. Rabbi Ari Kahn elaborates this view on the Orthodox Union website as follows:

In The Guide for the Perplexed, Maimonides argues that the story of the binding of Isaac contains two "great notions". First, Abraham's willingness to sacrifice Isaac demonstrates the limit of humanity's capability to both love and fear God. Second, because Abraham acted on a prophetic vision of what God had asked him to do, the story exemplifies how prophetic revelation has the same truth value as philosophical argument and thus carries equal certainty, notwithstanding the fact that it comes in a dream or vision.

In Glory and Agony: Isaac's Sacrifice and National Narrative, Yael Feldman argues that the story of Isaac's binding, in both its biblical and post-biblical versions (the New Testament included), has had a great impact on the ethos of altruist heroism and self-sacrifice in modern Hebrew national culture. As her study demonstrates, over the last century the "Binding of Isaac" has morphed into the "Sacrifice of Isaac", connoting both the glory and agony of heroic death on the battlefield.

In Legends of the Jews, rabbi Louis Ginzberg argues that the binding of Isaac is a way for God to test Isaac's claim to Ishmael, and to silence Satan's protest about Abraham who had not brought up any offering to God after Isaac was born, also to show a proof to the world that Abraham is the true God-fearing man who is ready to fulfill any of God's commands, even to sacrifice his own son:

Jacob Howland has pointed out that "Ginzberg's work must be used with caution, because his project fabricating a unified narrative from multiple sources inevitably makes the tradition of rabbinic commentary seem more univocal than it actually is." Ginzberg's work does not encompass the way in which midrash on 'Akedah mirrored the different needs of diverse Jewish communities. Isaac was resurrected after the slaughter in the version of medieval Ashkenaz. Spiegel has interpreted this as designed to recast the biblical figures in the context of the Crusades.

The Book of Genesis does not tell the age of Isaac at the time. Some Talmudic sages teach that Isaac was an adult aged thirty seven, likely based on the next biblical story, which is of Sarah's death at 127 years, being 90 when Isaac was born. Isaac's reaction to the binding is unstated in the biblical narrative. Some commentators have argued that he was traumatized and angry, often citing the fact that he and Abraham are never seen to speak to each other again; however, Jon D. Levenson notes that the biblical text never depicts them speaking before the binding, either.

Use in worship
The narrative of the sacrifice and binding of Isaac is traditionally read in synagogue on the second day of Rosh Hashanah.

The practice of the Kabbalists, observed in some communities but not all, is to recite this chapter every day immediately after Birkot hashachar.

Christian views

The binding of Isaac is mentioned in the New Testament Epistle to the Hebrews among many acts of faith recorded in the Old Testament: "By faith Abraham, when he was tested, offered up Isaac, and he who had received the promises offered up his only begotten son, of whom it was said, 'In Isaac your seed shall be called', concluding that God was able to raise him up, even from the dead, from which he also received him in a figurative sense." (Hebrews 11:17–19, NKJV)

Abraham's faith in God is such that he felt God would be able to resurrect the slain Isaac, in order that his prophecy (Genesis 21:12) might be fulfilled. Early Christian preaching sometimes accepted Jewish interpretations of the binding of Isaac without elaborating. For example, Hippolytus of Rome says in his Commentary on the Song of Songs, "The blessed Isaac became desirous of the anointing and he wished to sacrifice himself for the sake of the world" (On the Song 2:15).

Other Christians from the period saw Isaac as a type of the "Word of God" who prefigured Christ. This interpretation can be supported by symbolism and context such as Abraham sacrificing his son on the third day of the journey (Genesis 22:4), or Abraham taking the wood and putting it on his son Isaac's shoulder (Genesis 22:6). Another thing to note is how God reemphasizes Isaac being Abraham's one and only son whom he loves (Genesis 22:2,12,16). As further support to the view of early Christians that the binding of Isaac foretells the Gospel of Jesus Christ, when the two went up there, Isaac asked Abraham "where is the lamb for the burnt offering" to which Abraham responded "God himself will provide the lamb for the burnt offering, my son." (Genesis 22:7–8). However, it was a ram (not a lamb) that was ultimately sacrificed in Isaac's place, and the ram was caught in a thicket (i.e. thorn bush) (Genesis 22:13). In the New Testament, John the Baptist saw Jesus coming toward him and said "Look, the Lamb of God, who takes away the sins of the world!" (John 1:29). Thus, the binding is compared to the Crucifixion and the last-minute stay of sacrifice is a type of the Resurrection. Søren Kierkegaard describes Abraham's actions as arising from the zenith of faith leading to a "teleological suspension of the ethical".

Muslim views

The version in the Quran differs from that in Genesis in two aspects: the identity of the sacrificed son and the son's reaction towards the requested sacrifice. In Islamic sources, when Abraham tells his son about the vision, his son agreed to be sacrificed for the fulfillment of God's command, and no binding to the altar occurred. The Quran states that when Abraham asked for a righteous son, God granted him a son possessing forbearance. The son mentioned here is traditionally understood to be Ishmael. When the son was able to walk and work with him, Abraham saw a vision about sacrificing him. When he told his son about it, his son agreed to fulfill the command of God in the vision. When they both had submitted their will to God and were ready for the sacrifice, God told Abraham he had fulfilled the vision, and provided him with a ram to sacrifice instead. God promised to reward Abraham. The next two verses state God also granted Abraham the righteous son Isaac and promised more rewards.

Among early Muslim scholars, there was a dispute over the identity of the son. One side of the argument believed it was Isaac rather than Ishmael (notably ibn Qutaybah and al-Tabari) interpreting the verse "God's perfecting his mercy on Abraham and Isaac" as referring to his making Abraham his closest one, and to his rescuing Isaac. The other side, by far a vast majority, held that the promise to Sarah was of a son, Isaac, and a grandson, Jacob (Quran 11:71–74) excluded the possibility of a premature death of Isaac. Regardless, most Muslims believe that it is actually Ishmael rather than Isaac despite the dispute.

The submission of Abraham and his son is celebrated and commemorated by Muslims on the days of Eid al-Adha. During the festival, those who can afford and the ones in the pilgrimage sacrifice a ram, cow, sheep or a camel. Part of the sacrifice meat is eaten by the household and remaining is distributed to the neighbors and the needy. The festival marks the end of the Hajj pilgrimage to Mecca.

Modern research
The binding also figures prominently in the writings of several of the more important modern theologians, such as Søren Kierkegaard in Fear and Trembling and Shalom Spiegel in The Last Trial. Jewish communities regularly review this literature, for instance the 2009 mock trial held by more than 600 members of the University Synagogue of Orange County, California. Derrida also looks at the story of the sacrifice as well as Kierkegaard's reading in The Gift of Death.

In Mimesis: The Representation of Reality in Western Literature, the literary critic Erich Auerbach considers the Hebrew narrative of the binding of Isaac, along with Homer's description of Odysseus's scar, as the two paradigmatic models for the representation of reality in literature. Auerbach contrasts Homer's attention to detail and foregrounding of the spatial, historical, as well as personal contexts for events to the Bible's sparse account, in which virtually all context is kept in the background or left outside of the narrative. As Auerbach observes, this narrative strategy virtually compels readers to add their own interpretations to the text.

Redactors and narrative purpose
Modern biblical critics operating under the framework of the documentary hypothesis have ascribed the binding's narrative to the biblical source Elohist, on the grounds that it generally uses the specific term Elohim and parallels characteristic E compositions. On that view, the second angelic appearance to Abraham (v. 14–18), praising his obedience and blessing his offspring, is in fact a later Jahwist interpolation to E's original account (v. 1–13, 19). This is supported by the style and composition of these verses, as well as by the use of the name Yahweh for the deity.

More recent studies question the analysis of E and J as strictly separate. Coats argues that Abraham's obedience to God's command in fact necessitates praise and blessing, which he only receives in the second angelic speech. That speech, therefore, could not have been simply inserted into E's original account. This has suggested to many that the author responsible for the interpolation of the second angelic appearance has left his mark also on the original account (v. 1–13, 19).

More recently it has been suggested that these traces are in fact the first angelic appearance (v. 11–12), in which the Angel of YHWH stops Abraham before he kills Isaac. The style and composition of these verses resemble that of the second angelic speech, and YHWH is used for the deity rather than God. On that reading, in the original E version of the binding Abraham disobeys God's command, sacrificing the ram "instead of his son" (v. 13) on his own responsibility and without being stopped by an angel: "And Abraham stretched forth his hand, and took the knife to slay his son; but Abraham lifted up his eyes and looked and beheld, behind him was a ram, caught in a thicket by his horns; and Abraham went, and took the ram, and offered it up as a burnt offering instead of his son" (v. 10, 13).

By interpolating the first appearance of the angel, a later redactor shifted responsibility for halting the test from Abraham to the angel (v. 11–12). The second angelic appearance, in which Abraham is rewarded for his obedience (v. 14–18), became necessary due to that shift of responsibility. This analysis of the story sheds light on the connection between the binding and the story of Sodom, in which Abraham protests against God's unethical plan to destroy the city, without distinguishing between the righteous and the wicked: Far be it from you to do such a thing: Shall not the judge of all the earth do what is just?" Abraham's ethical rebellion against God in the destruction of Sodom culminates in his disobedience to God, refusing to sacrifice Isaac.

Possible child sacrifice

Francesca Stavrakopoulou has speculated that it is possible that the story "contains traces of a tradition in which Abraham does sacrifice Isaac". R. E. Friedman argued that in the original E story, Abraham may have carried out the sacrifice of Isaac, but that later repugnance at the idea of a human sacrifice led the redactor of JE to add the lines in which a ram is substituted for Isaac. Likewise, Terence Fretheim wrote that "the text bears no specific mark of being a polemic against child sacrifice". Wojciech Kosior also points at the genealogical snippet (verses 20–24) as containing a hint to an alternative reading where Abraham sacrificed Isaac.

Interpretations of the text have contradicted the version where a ram is sacrificed.  For example, Martin S. Bergmann states "The Aggadah rabbis asserted that "father Isaac was bound on the altar and reduced to ashes, and his sacrificial dust was cast on  Mount Moriah." A similar interpretation was made in the Epistle to the Hebrews. Margaret Barker notes that "Abraham returned to Bersheeba without Isaac" according to  a possible sign that he was indeed sacrificed.  Barker also notes that wall paintings in the ancient Dura-Europos synagogue explicitly show Isaac being sacrificed, followed by his soul traveling to heaven. According to Jon D. Levenson a part of Jewish tradition interpreted Isaac as having been sacrificed. Similarly the German theologians  and  maintain that due to the grammatical perfect tense used to describe Abraham's sacrifice of Isaac, he did, in fact, follow through with the action.

Rabbi A.I. Kook, first Chief Rabbi of Israel, stressed that the climax of the story, commanding Abraham not to sacrifice Isaac, is the whole point: to put an end to, and G-d's total aversion to the ritual of child sacrifice.  According to Irving Greenberg the story of the binding of Isaac, symbolizes the prohibition to worship God by human sacrifices, at a time when human sacrifices were the norm worldwide.

Rite of passage
It has been suggested that Genesis 22 contains an intrusion of the liturgy of a rite of passage, including mock sacrifice, as commonly found in early and preliterate societies, marking the passage from youth to adulthood.

Music 
The Binding of Isaac has inspired multiple pieces of music, including Marc-Antoine Charpentier's Sacrificium Abrahae (H.402, oratorio for soloists, chorus, doubling instruments, and bc; 1680–81), Leonard Cohen's "Story of Isaac" from the 1969 album Songs from a Room, the eponymous "Highway 61 Revisited" from Highway 61 Revisited (1965) by Bob Dylan, Sufjan Stevens' "Abraham" from the album Seven Swans (2004), Gilad Hochman's "Akeda for Solo Viola" (2006), and Anaïs Mitchell's "Dyin' Day" from the album Young Man in America (2012).

See also 

 The Binding of Isaac (video game) and The Binding of Isaac: Rebirth
 Child sacrifice
 Covenant of the pieces
 Eid al-Adha
 Fear and Trembling
 Filicide
 Free will
 Iphigenia
 Jephthah's daughter
 Phrixus in Greek mythology, child sacrifice thwarted by ram
 Vayeira, the parashah containing the binding of Isaac

Notes

References

External links

 Symposium on the Sacrifice of Isaac in the Three Monotheistic Religions
 The Sacrifice of Isaac in Medieval English Drama
 Mystery play texts in the cycles from Chester, Wakefield, York and n-Town 
 Shofar Callin' (G-dcast's animated retelling of the Binding of Isaac, to a hip hop soundtrack)

Abraham
Angelic apparitions in the Bible
Human sacrifice
Isaac
Jewish sacrificial law
Shacharit
Siddur of Orthodox Judaism
Vayeira
Child sacrifice
Rosh Hashanah

pt:Abraão#Deus prova a fé de Abraão